Events in the year 1854 in Belgium.

Incumbents
 Monarch: Leopold I
 Head of government: Henri de Brouckère

Events
 27 February – Commercial treaty with France on tariffs, transit and navigation for five years.
 22 May – Provincial elections
 13 June – Partial legislative elections of 1854

Publications
Periodicals
 Almanach royal officiel (Brussels, H. Tarlier)
 Annales de l'Académie d'archéologie de Belgique, vol. 11 (Antwerp, Froment)
 Annales de pomologie belge et étrangère, vol. 2.
 Isidore de Stein d'Altenstein (ed.), Annuaire de la noblesse de Belgique, vol. 8 (Brussels, Auguste Decq and C. Muquardt)
 Bulletins de l'Académie Royale des Sciences, des Lettres et des Beaux-Arts de Belgique, 21 (Brussels, Hayez)
 Collection de précis historiques, vol. 5, edited by Edouard Terwecoren
 Messager des sciences historiques (Ghent, L. Hebbelynck)

Books
 Hendrik Conscience, Tales of Flemish life (Constable's Miscellany of Foreign Literature 3; Edinburgh, Thomas Constable)
 Charles Meerts, Dictionnaire Géographique et Statistique du Royaume de Belgique (Brussels, H. Goemaere)
 Jules de Saint-Genois, Historische verhalen
 Exposition générale des Beaux-Arts, 1854: Catalogue explicatif (Brussels, G. Stapleaux)

Art and architecture

Paintings
 Antoine Wiertz, The Premature Burial

Births
 22 April – Henri La Fontaine, Nobel Prize laureate (died 1943)
 15 May – Émile Van Arenbergh, magistrate and writer (died 1934)
 25 May – Joseph Van den Gheyn, Jesuit (died 1913)
 2 July – Achille Gerste, Jesuit linguist (died 1920)
 18 July – Émile Dossin de Saint-Georges, general (died 1936)
 22 October – Édouard de Laveleye, engineer (died 1938)
 31 October – Rémy Cogghe, painter (died 1935)

Deaths
 28 February – Zoé de Gamond (born 1806), feminist 
 17 September – Joseph De Cauwer (born 1779), painter
 16 October – Goswin de Stassart (born 1780), politician

References

 
Belgium
Years of the 19th century in Belgium
1850s in Belgium
Belgium